Mohawk Girls is a 2005 documentary film by Tracey Deer about the experiences of adolescent girls growing up on the Mohawk reserve of Kahnawake, across the Saint Lawrence River from Montreal, Quebec. Deer, who was born and raised in Kahnawake, focuses on three young women:Felicia, Amy and Lauren, a mixed race teen.

The film received the Best Documentary prize at the ImagineNATIVE Film + Media Arts Festival. It was produced by Rezolution Pictures and the National Film Board of Canada in association with broadcaster Aboriginal Peoples Television Network. The film also aired in Canada on CBC Newsworld's documentary series The Lens on February 20, 2007 and February 24, 2007.

Series
In 2012, APTN and OMNI Television announced the production of a scripted comedy-drama series based on the film also called Mohawk Girls.

References

External links
Teacher's Guide
National Film Board of Canada webpage

2005 films
National Film Board of Canada documentaries
Documentary films about First Nations
Mohawk-language films
Documentary films about women
Films directed by Tracey Deer
Canadian coming-of-age films
Canadian documentary television films
Documentary films about adolescence
Rezolution Pictures films
Women in Quebec
2000s Canadian films